The Arcida is an extant order of  bivalve molluscs.  This order dates back to the lower Ordovician period. They are distinguished from related groups, such as the mussels, by having a straight hinge to the shells, and the adductor muscles being of equal size.  The duplivincular ligament, taxodont dentition, and a shell microstructure consisting of the outer crossed lamellar and inner complex crossed lamellar layers are defining characters of this order.

Seven families are currently recognised within the order, including the well-known ark clams or ark shells in the family Arcidae.

Taxonomy
The order Arcida, as the suborder Arcacea, is included in the order Taxodonta by R.C. Moore, 1952, characterised by simple hinge-line dentition consisting of small, numerous, similar hinge teeth, separate mantle lobes, poorly developed siphons, and filibranch gills.

In 2010, Bieler, Carter & Coan proposed a new classification system for the Bivalvia which combines the taxodont Arcida with the dysodont Limida Mytilida, Ostreida and Pteriida as the Pteriomorphia. Subtaxa included in the Arcida are shown below.

In 2016, the superfamilies of Arcida changed from two to three, with an additional superfamily of fossils only.  The new taxonomy is as follows:
Superfamily Arcoidea Lamarck, 1809
Family Arcidae Lamarck, 1809
Family Catamarcaiidae Cope, 2000
Family Cucullaeidae Stewart, 1930
Family Frejidae Ratter & Cope, 1998
Family Glycymerididae Dall, 1908 (1847)
Family Noetiidae Stewart, 1930
Family Parallelodontidae Dall, 1898
Superfamily Glyptarcoidea Cope, 1996: with fossil species only.
Family Glyptarcidae Cope, 1996
Family Pucamyidae Sánchez & Benedetto, 2007
Superfamily Limopsoidea Dall, 1895
Family Limopsidae Dall, 1895
Family Philobryidae F. Bernard, 1897

References

External links

 
Bivalve orders